Charbel Georges Merhi, MLM (born on 12 October 1937 in Edde, Lebanon) was bishop of the Maronite Catholic Eparchy of San Charbel in Buenos Aires from 1990 to 2012.

Biography
On 29 August 1964 Merhi was ordained priest and became Chaplain of the MLM. His appointment as first bishop of the Maronite Catholic Eparchy of San Charbel in Buenos Aires took place on 5 October 1990. Maronite Patriarch of Antioch, Nasrallah Pierre Sfeir consecrated him bishop on 2 December 1990. His co-consecrators were Bishop Georges Abi-Saber, OLM, from Canada and Roland Aboujaoudé, auxiliary bishop of Antioch. Merhi was installed as eparchy on 17 March 1991. As a participant in the Special Assembly of the Synod of Bishops for the Middle East, in October 2010, he stressed the need for peace between Christians and Muslims, because, as he pointed out, they are all children of Abraham.

On 17 April 2013, Pope Francis accepted his resignation.

References

External links

 http://www.catholic-hierarchy.org/bishop/bmerhi.html 
 http://aica.org/aica/igl_arg/obispos/ob_biografias/Merhi.html

1937 births
Lebanese Maronites
Living people
21st-century Maronite Catholic bishops
People from Mount Lebanon Governorate
20th-century Maronite Catholic bishops